Las Baulas de Guanacaste Marine National Park is a National Park of Costa Rica and a  Ramsar Site. The park is managed by the Tempisque Conservation Area, and covers approximately a  marine area of the Tamarindo Bay, next to the town of Tamarindo. It supports the largest nesting colony of leatherback sea turtles on the Pacific coast of the Americas. Female leatherbacks often come ashore at Playa Grande (Grande Beach) between October and May to lay their eggs.

More than half the park is underwater and protected but still allows recreation, such as surfing. The park has white-sand beaches and forests. The forests are home to approximately 174 species of birds and many other animals. The National Park covers four beaches (Carbón, Ventanas, Grande and Langosta), as well as the Tamarindo estuary and mangroves at the mouth of the Matapalo River and the San Francisco River Estuary. To the north, the Cerros Morro and Hermosa are also included.

The Tamarindo estuary Ramsar site which was previously designated as the Tamarindo Wildlife Refuge is now located in this national park.

Gallery

References

Nature reserves in Costa Rica
Protected areas established in 1991
Geography of Guanacaste Province
Tourist attractions in Guanacaste Province
1991 establishments in Costa Rica
Ramsar sites in Costa Rica